The Class 810 was a class of steam tender locomotives for freight trains with 2-8-0 wheel arrangement operated by the Chōsen Railway in colonial Korea.

Description
The first four were built for the Chōsen Railway in 1935 by Kisha Seizō of Japan for use on the railway's Hambuk Line, intended to haul iron ore trains; they were numbered 810 through 813. Work to convert this line was converted to standard gauge was completed on 1 May 1940, after which the locomotives were transferred to the railway's Hwanghae Line, Suin Line, and Suryeo Line.

A second batch of four, numbers 814 through 817 were delivered by Kisha Seizō in 1936.

Postwar
After the Liberation and partition of Korea, these locomotives were divided between the Korean State Railway of North Korea and the Korean National Railroad of South Korea. Those which ended up in the North were numbered in the 500 series, with three still surviving - one operational - in 2004.

Construction

References

Locomotives of Korea
Locomotives of North Korea
Locomotives of South Korea
Railway locomotives introduced in 1935
2-8-0 locomotives
Kisha Seizo locomotives
Narrow gauge steam locomotives of Korea
Chosen Railway